Calgary Nose Hill (formerly Calgary—Nose Hill) is a federal electoral district in Alberta, Canada, that has been represented in the House of Commons of Canada since 1997.

Geography

It consists of the part of the City of Calgary clockwise within the following line: from the northern limit of the city along: Centre Street North, Harvest Hills Boulevard North, Beddington Trail NW, Deerfoot Trail, McKnight Boulevard, John Laurie Boulevard NW, Sarcee Trail, Stoney Trail, 14 Street north to the northern limit of the city.

Demographics
According to the Canada 2011 Census

Ethnic groups: 56.0% White, 19.8% Chinese, 7.0% South Asian, 3.7% Indigenous, 3.1% Filipino, 2.8% Black, 2.2% Arab, 2.2% Latino, 1.9% Southeast Asian, 1.3% Other
Languages: 78.0% English, 12.9% Chinese, 1.0% Punjabi, 1.0% Spanish, 7.1% Other
Religions: 52.2% Christian, 4.9% Muslim, 3.3% Buddhist, 1.9% Hindu, 1.4% Sikh, 0.6% Other, 35.7% None
Median income: $37,048 (2010) 
Average income: $51,586 (2010)

History
This riding was created in 1996 from Calgary North and Wild Rose ridings.

In 2003, parts of this electoral district were transferred to Calgary Centre-North riding.

In the 2012 federal electoral boundaries redistribution Calgary—Nose Hill lost the emdash in its name. It also lost all of its territory north of Stoney Trail and west of Sarcee Trail and John Laurie Blvd to the new riding of Calgary Rocky Ridge, while gaining back the area north of a line following John Laurie Blvd to McKnight Blvd from Calgary Centre-North. This was legally defined in the 2013 representation order and came into effect upon the call of the October 19, 2015 42nd Canadian federal election.

Members of Parliament

This riding has elected the following Members of Parliament:

Election results

Calgary Nose Hill (2013-present)

Calgary—Nose Hill (1996-2013)

Adjacent ridings

 Calgary Centre-North
 Calgary Northeast
 Calgary West
 Wild Rose

See also
 List of Canadian federal electoral districts
 Past Canadian electoral districts

Notes

References

 
 
 Expenditures - 2008
 Expenditures - 2004
 Expenditures - 2000
 Expenditures - 1997

External links
 Elections Canada
 Website of the Parliament of Canada

Alberta federal electoral districts
Politics of Calgary